Dhawal Sunil Kulkarni (born 10 December 1988) is an Indian cricketer as well as first class cricketer. He is a right arm medium-pace bowler and right-handed lower order batsman.

In first class cricket, he plays for Mumbai and in the Indian Premier League, he plays for Mumbai Indians Based on his consistent performance in the domestic season and the IPL, he was selected for the Indian Test team for the away series against New Zealand in 2009. But he was not selected to play in any of the three Test matches of the series.

Domestic career 
In the 2012-13 Ranji Trophy, he was one of the key faces to make Mumbai the Ranji Trophy champions for the 40th time. He took 5/33 against the Services in the Semi-final, after scoring 20* in the 1st innings. He followed it up with 4/24 and 5/32 against 1st time finalists Saurashtra to bowl them out for 148 and 82, and thus ensure a win by an innings and 125 runs in the final. He was rewarded with a chance in the India A cricket squad. He was selected for the quadrangular series in 2014 where he played a key role for India winning the cup.

For his performances in the 2016 IPL season, he was named in the Cricinfo and Cricbuzz IPL XI 

He was the leading wicket-taker for Mumbai in the 2017–18 Ranji Trophy, with 21 dismissals in six matches.

In January 2018, he was bought by the Rajasthan Royals in the 2018 IPL auction. In July 2018, he was named in the squad for India Blue for the 2018–19 Duleep Trophy. In October 2018, he was named in India A's squad for the 2018–19 Deodhar Trophy. In October 2019, he was named in India C's squad for the 2019–20 Deodhar Trophy.

International career 
He was included in the Test squad for the tour of New Zealand in 2009 but didn't make a debut. Following this success of quadrangular series in 2014 he was selected for the ODI squad for England tour. He made his One Day International debut in the 4th ODI against England in September 2014 at Edgbaston. He made his Twenty20 International (T20I) debut against Zimbabwe at Harare on 20 June 2016.

References

1988 births
Living people
Indian cricketers
India Twenty20 International cricketers
India One Day International cricketers
Mumbai cricketers
Mumbai Indians cricketers
West Zone cricketers
India Blue cricketers
India Green cricketers
India Red cricketers
Gujarat Lions cricketers
Wellington cricketers